The order Trigonotarbida is a group of extinct arachnids whose fossil record extends from the late Silurian to the early Permian (Pridoli to Sakmarian). These animals are known from several localities in Europe and North America, as well as a single record from Argentina. Trigonotarbids can be envisaged as spider-like arachnids, but without silk-producing spinnerets. They ranged in size from a few millimetres to a few centimetres in body length and had segmented abdomens (opisthosoma), with the dorsal exoskeleton (tergites) across the backs of the animals' abdomens, which were characteristically divided into three or five separate plates. Probably living as predators on other arthropods, some later trigonotarbid species were quite heavily armoured and protected themselves with spines and tubercles. About seventy species are currently known, with most fossils originating from the Carboniferous coal measures.

Historical background

The first trigonotarbid was described in 1837 from the coal measures of Coalbrookdale in England by the famous English geologist Dean William Buckland. He believed it to be a fossil beetle and named it Curculoides prestvicii. A much better preserved example was later discovered from Coseley near Dudley; also in the English West Midlands conurbation. Woodward subsequently described another trigonotarbid, Brachypyge carbonis, from the coal measures of Mons in Belgium; although this fossil is known only from its abdomen and was initially mistaken for those of a crab.

A new arachnid order

In 1882, the German zoologist Ferdinand Karsch described a number of fossil arachnids from the coal measures of Neurode in Silesia (now Poland), including one he named Anthracomartus voelkelianus in honour of Herr Völkel, the foreman of the mine where it was discovered. This species was raised to a new, extinct, arachnid order which Karsch called Anthracomarti. A number of other fossils which would eventually be placed in Trigonotarbida were discovered around this time. Hanns Bruno Geinitz described Kreischeria wiedei from the coal measures of Zwickau in Germany, although he interpreted it as a fossil pseudoscorpion. Johann Kušta described Anthracomartus krejcii from Rakovník in the Czech Republic, and published further descriptions in a number of subsequent papers. In 1884, Samuel Hubbard Scudder described Anthracomartus trilobitus from Fayetteville, Arkansas—the first trigonotarbid from North America.

Relationships

Early studies tended to confuse trigonotarbids with other living or extinct groups of arachnids; particularly harvestmen (Opiliones). Petrunkevitch's division of the trigonotarbids into two, unrelated, orders was noted above. In detail, he divided the arachnids into suborders based on the width of the division between the two parts of the body (the prosoma and opisthosoma). Anthracomartida and another extinct order, Haptopoda, were grouped into a subclass Stethostomata defined by a broad division of the body and downward-hanging mouthparts. Trigonotarbida was placed in its own subclass Soluta and defined as having a division of the body which was variable in width. Petrunkevitch's scheme was largely followed in subsequent studies of fossil arachnids.

Pantetrapulmonata
In the 1980s, Bill Shear and colleagues carried out an important study on well preserved Mid Devonian trigonotarbids from Gilboa, New York. They questioned whether it was appropriate to define a group of animals on a variable character state and carried out the first cladistic analysis of fossil and living arachnids. They showed that trigonotarbids are closely related to a group of arachnids which have gone under various names (Caulogastra, Arachnidea, etc.), but for which the name Tetrapulmonata has become most widespread. Members of the Tetrapulmonata include spiders (Araneae), whip spiders (Amblypygi), whip scorpions (Uropygi) and shorttailed whipscorpion (Schizomida) and, together with trigonotarbids, share characters like two pairs of book lungs and similar mouthparts with fangs operating rather like a pocket knife. In a 2007 study of arachnid relationships, the Shear et al. hypothesis was largely supported and a group Pantetrapulmonata was proposed which comprises Trigonotarbida + Tetrapulmonata. This has since been corroborated in more recent cladistic analyses.

Trigonotarbids and ricinuleids

In 1892, Ferdinand Karsch suggested that the rare and rather bizarre-looking ricinuleids (Ricinulei) were the last living descendants of the trigonotarbids. A similar hypothesis was reintroduced by Dunlop, who pointed out distinct similarities and possible sister group relationship between these arachnid groups. Both have opisthosomal tergites divided into median and lateral plates and both have a complicated coupling mechanism between the prosoma and the opisthosoma which 'locks' the two halves of the body together. Although cladistic analysis has tended to recover ricinuleids in their traditional position closely related to mites and ticks, further discoveries have revealed that the tip of the pedipalp ends in a small claw in both trigonotarbids and ricinuleids. If the hypothesis is true, ricinuleids, despite the lack of tetrapulmonate key characters (e.g. book lungs), may represent part of the pantetrapulmonate clade alongside trigonotarbids as well.

Internal relationships
The first cladistic analysis of the trigonotarbids was published in 2014. This recovered the families Anthracomartidae, Anthracosironidae, and Eophrynidae as monophyletic. In contrast Trigonotarbidae, Aphantomartidae, Palaeocharinidae, and Kreischeriidae were not. Two clades were consistently recovered with strong support—(Palaeocharinus (Archaeomartidae + Anthracomartidae)), and Lissomartus as sister group the 'eophrynid assemblage' (Aphantomartus (Alkenia (Pseudokreischeria (Kreischeria (Eophrynus + Pleophrynus))))).

Description

Trigonotarbids superficially resemble spiders, but can be easily recognised by having tergites on the dorsal side of the opisthosoma divided into median and lateral plates. This character is shared with ricinuleids (Ricinulei) (see also Ricinulei#Relationships). As in other arachnids, the body is divided into a prosoma (or cephalothorax) and opisthosoma (or abdomen).

Prosoma
The prosoma is covered by the carapace and always bears a pair of median eyes. In the probably basal families Palaeocharinidae, Anthracomartidae—and perhaps also Anthracosironidae—there is an additional pair of lateral eye tubercles which, at least in palaeocharinids, appear to have borne a series of individual lenses. In this sense palaeocharinids seem to be in the process of reducing a compound eye. Anterior margin of the carapace protrude into a projection referred to as clypeus.

The chelicerae are of the "pocket-knife" type consisting of a basal segment and a sharp, curving fang. The chelicerae are described as paleognathic: the fangs are held parallel to one another, like those of mesothele and mygalomorph spiders, but the chelicerae hang downwards like those of araneomorph spiders. There is no evidence in well-preserved fossils for the opening of a venom gland, thus trigonotarbids were probably not venomous. The chelicerae may have been slightly retractable into the prosoma. Well-preserved palaeocharinids show evidence for a small, slit-like mouth with an upper lip (a labrum or rostrum) and a lower lip (or labium). Inside the mouth there is some sort of filtering system formed from hairs or platelets which strongly suggests that trigonotarbids (like spiders and many other arachnids) could eat only preorally digested, liquified prey.

The pedipalps have the typical arachnid structure with a coxa, trochanter, femur, patella, tibia and tarsus. They are pediform, i.e. they look like small legs and were not highly modified. There is no evidence for a special sperm transfer device as in the modified palpal organ of male spiders. In at least the palaeocharinids and anthracomartids the tip of the pedipalp is modified into a small chela (claw) formed from the tarsal claw (or apotele) and a projection from the tarsus. As mentioned above, a very similar arrangement is seen at the end of the pedipalp in Ricinulei.

The walking legs again follow the typical arachnid plan with a coxa, trochanter, femur, patella, tibia, metatarsus and tarsus. The coxae surround a single sternum. In well preserved palaeocharinids there is a ring, or annulus, around the trochanter–femur joint which may be the remains of an earlier leg segment. The legs are largely unmodified, although in Anthracosironidae the forelegs are quite large and spiny, presumably to help catch prey. The legs end in three claws, two large ones and a smaller median claw.

Opisthosoma 

The opisthosoma is largely suboval in outline with a flatten dorsal surface. It compose of 12 segments, with some of them had undergone degrees of fusion or reduction, hence the previous misinterpretation of around 8 to 11 segments. Tergite of the first segment partially covered by the  posterior margin of preceding carapace, forming a complicated coupling mechanism known as 'locking ridge'. Tergites of segment 2 to 8 (segment 9 in some species) were all laterally divided into 3 (one median and two lateral) plates, with those of segment 2 and 3 fused to each other in most species. However, the corresponding tergites of the family Anthracomartidae are further subdivided into 5 plates. The last 3 segments are usually only visible from the ventral side, with the 2 final segments constricted into a tiny ring-like section known as pygidium.

Ventral side of opisthosomal segment 2 to 9 covered by series of lung-bearing opercula (2 and 3) and curved sternites (4 to 9). The first segment apparently lacking any ventral plates. Just like other lung-bearing arachnids (scorpion and tetrapulmonate), the book lungs of trigonotarbids formed by layers of trabecula-bearing lamellae, which is a feature adapted to a terrestrial, air-breathing lifestyle. A pair of ventral sacs located between the posterior operculum and following sternite had been observed in some species.

Paleobiology 
In July 2014 scientists used computer-based techniques to re-create a possible walking gait for the animal. A subsequent review article suggested by comparison with mites, with presumably similar lifestyle and environment, a metachronal rather than alternating leg coordination was more likely. Subsequent work by the researchers behind the initial publication used simulation approaches to assess the efficiency of a range of gaits using an updated trigonotarbid model.

Included taxa 
As of 2020, 70 valid species had been included under Trigonotarbida as follows:

plesion taxa
 Palaeotarbus Dunlop, 1999
 Palaeotarbus jerami (Dunlop, 1996) – Late Silurian, England

Palaeocharinidae Hirst, 1923
 Aculeatarbus Shear, Selden & Rolfe, 1987
 Aculeatarbus depressus Shear, Selden & Rolfe, 1987 – Mid Devonian, United States
 Gelasinotarbus Shear, Selden & Rolfe, 1987
 Gelasinotarbus bifidus Shear, Selden & Rolfe, 1987 – Mid Devonian, United States
 Gelasinotarbus bonamoae Shear, Selden & Rolfe, 1987 – Mid Devonian, United States
 Gelasinotarbus heptops Shear, Selden & Rolfe, 1987 – Mid Devonian, United States
 Gelasinotarbus reticulatus Shear, Selden & Rolfe, 1987 – Mid Devonian, United States
 Gigantocharinus Shear, 2000
 Gigantocharinus szatmaryi Shear, 2000 – Late Devonian, United States
 Gilboarachne Shear, Selden & Rolfe, 1987
 Gilboarachne griersoni Shear, Selden & Rolfe, 1987 – Mid Devonian, United States
 Palaeocharinus Hirst, 1923
 Palaeocharinus calmani Hirst, 1923 – Early Devonian, Scotland
 Palaeocharinus hornei Hirst, 1923 – Early Devonian, Scotland
 Palaeocharinus kidstoni Hirst, 1923 – Early Devonian, Scotland
 Palaeocharinus rhyniensis Hirst, 1923 – Early Devonian, Scotland
 Palaeocharinus scourfieldi Hirst, 1923 – Early Devonian, Scotland
 Palaeocharinus tuberculatus Fayers, Dunlop & Trewin, 2005 – Early Devonian, Scotland
Spinocharinus Poschmann & Dunlop, 2011
Spinocharinus steinmeyeri Poschman & Dunlop, 2011 - Devonian, Bürdenbach

Archaeomartidae Haase, 1890
 Archaeomartus Størmer, 1970
 Archaeomartus levis Størmer, 1970 - Devonian, Alken an der Mosel

Anthracomartidae Haase, 1890
synonyms
= Promygalidae Frič, 1904
= Brachypygidae Pocock, 1911
= Coryphomartidae Petrunkevitch, 1945
= Pleomartidae Petrunkevitch, 1945
Anthracomartus Karsch, 1882
 synonyms
 = Brachylycosa Frič, 1904
 = Cleptomartus Petrunkevitch, 1949
 = Coryphomartus Petrunkevitch, 1945
 = Cryptomartus Petrunkevitch, 1945
 = Oomartus Petrunkevitch, 1953
 = Perneria Frič, 1904
 = Pleomartus Petrunkevitch, 1945
 = Promygale Frič, 1901
 Anthracomartus bohemica (Frič, 1901) – Late Carboniferous, Czech Republic
 Anthracomartus carcinoides (Frič, 1901) – Late Carboniferous, Czech Republic
 synonyms
 = Promygale rotunda Frič, 1901
 = Perneria salticoides Frič, 1904
 Anthracomartus elegans Frič, 1901 – Late Carboniferous, Czech Republic
 Anthracomartus hindi Pocock, 1911 – Late Carboniferous, England
 synonyms
 = Cleptomartus hangardi Guthörl, 1965
 = Cryptomartus meyeri Guthörl, 1964
 = Cleptomartus planus Petrunkevitch, 1949
 = Cryptomartus rebskei Brauckmann, 1984
 Anthracomartus granulatus Frič, 1904 – Late Carboniferous, Poland
 Anthracomartus janae (Opluštil, 1986) – Late Carboniferous, Czech Republic
 Anthracomartus kustae Petrunkevitch, 1953 – Late Carboniferous, Czech Republic
 Anthracomartus minor Kušta, 1884 – Late Carboniferous, Czech Republic
 synonym
 = Anthracomartus socius Kušta, 1888
 Anthracomartus nyranensis (Petrunkevitch, 1953) – Late Carboniferous, Czech Republic
 Anthracomartus palatinus Ammon, 1901 – Late Carboniferous, Germany
 Anthracomartus priesti Pocock, 1911 – Late Carboniferous, England
 synonyms
= Anthracomartus denuiti Pruvost, 1922
= Cleptomartus plautus Petrunkevitch, 1949
 Anthracomartus radvanicensis (Opluštil, 1985) – Late Carboniferous, Czech Republic
 Anthracomartus triangularis Petrunkevitch, 1913 – Late Carboniferous, Canada
 Anthracomartus trilobitus Scudder, 1884 – Late Carboniferous, United States
 Anthracomartus voelkelianus Karsch, 1882 – Late Carboniferous, Poland
 Brachypyge Woodward, 1878
 Brachypyge carbonis Woodward, 1878 – Late Carboniferous, Belgium
 Maiocercus Pocock, 1911
 Maiocercus celticus (Pocock, 1902) – Late Carboniferous, Europe
synonym
= Maiocercus orbicularis Gill, 1911

Anthracosironidae Pocock, 1903
 Anthracosiro Pocock, 1903
 Anthracosiro fritschii Pocock, 1903 – Late Carboniferous, Europe
synonym
= Anthracosiro elongatus Waterlot, 1934
 Anthracosiro woodwardi Pocock, 1903 – Late Carboniferous, Europe
synonyms
= Anthracosiro corsini Pruvost, 1926
= Anthracosiro latipes Gill, 1909
 Arianrhoda Dunlop & Selden, 2004
 Arianrhoda bennetti Dunlop & Selden, 2004 – Early Devonian, Wales
Vratislavia Frič, 1904
Vratislavia silesica (Roemer, 1878) -  Carboniferous, Silesia

Trigonotarbidae Petrunkevitch, 1949
 Trigonotarbus Pocock, 1911
 Trigonotarbus arnoldi Petrunkevitch, 1955 – Late Carboniferous, France
 Trigonotarbus johnsoni Pocock, 1911 – Late Carboniferous, England
 Trigonotarbus stoermeri Schultka, 1991 – Early Devonian, Germany

Lissomartidae Dunlop, 1995
 Lissomartus Petrunkevitch, 1949
 Lissomartus carbonarius (Petrunkevitch, 1913) – Late Carboniferous, United States
 Lissomartus schucherti (Petrunkevitch, 1913) – Late Carboniferous, United States

Aphantomartidae Petrunkevitch, 1945
 synonym
= Trigonomartidae Petrunkevitch, 1949
Alkenia Størmer, 1970
Alkenia mirabilis Størmer, 1970 - Devonian, Alken an der Mosel
Aphantomartus Pocock, 1911
 synonyms
=  Trigonomartus Petrunkevitch, 1913
=  Phrynomartus Petrunkevitch, 1945a
Aphantomartus areolatus Pocock, 1911 – Early/Late Carboniferous, Europe
synonyms
= Aphantomartus pococki Pruvost, 1912
= Trigonomartus dorlodoti Pruvost, 1930
= Eophrynus waechteri Guthörl, 1938
= ?Trigonomartus pruvosti van der Heide, 1951
= ?Brachylycosa manebachensis Müller, 1957
 Aphantomartus ilfeldicus (Scharf, 1924) – Permian, Germany
 Aphantomartus pustulatus (Scudder, 1884) – Late Carboniferous, Europe, North America
synonyms
= ?Kreischeria villeti Pruvost, 1912
= Cleptomartus plötzensis Simon, 1971

Kreischeriidae Haase, 1890
 Anzinia Petrunkevitch, 1953
 Anzinia thevenini (Pruvost, 1919) – Late Carboniferous, France
 Gondwanarache Pinto & Hünicken, 1980
 Gondwanarache argentinensis Pinto & Hünicken, 1980 – Late Carboniferous, Argentina
 Hemikreischeria Frič, 1904
 Hemikreischeria geinitzi (Thevenin, 1902) – Late Carboniferous, France
 Kreischeria Geinitz, 1882
 Kreischeria wiedei Geinitz, 1882 – Late Carboniferous, Germany
 Pseudokreischeria Petrunkevitch, 1953
 Pseudokreischeria pococki (Gill, 1924) – Late Carboniferous, England
synonym
= Eophrynus varius Petrunkevitch, 1949

Eophrynidae Karsch, 1882
 synonym
= Hemiphrynidae Frič, 1904
 Eophrynus Woodward, 1871
 Eophrynus prestvicii (Buckland, 1837) – Late Carboniferous, England
 Eophrynus udus Brauckmann, Koch & Kemper, 1985 – Late Carboniferous, Germany
 Nyranytarbus Harvey & Selden, 1995
 synonym
Hemiphrynus Frič, 1901
Nyranytarbus hofmanni (Frič, 1901) – Late Carboniferous, Czech Republic
 Nyranytarbus longipes (Frič, 1901) – Late Carboniferous, Czech Republic
 Petrovicia Frič, 1904
 Petrovicia proditoria Frič, 1904 – Late Carboniferous, Czech Republic
 Planomartus Petrunkevitch, 1953
 Planomartus krejcii (Kušta, 1883) – Late Carboniferous, Czech Republic
synonym
= Anthracomartus affinis Kušta, 1885
 Pleophrynus Petrunkevitch, 1945a
 Pleophrynus verrucosus (Pocock, 1911) – Late Carboniferous, UK, United States
synonym
= Eophrynus warei Dix & Pringle, 1930
= Pleophrynus ensifer Petrunkevitch, 1945a
= Eophrynus jugatus Ambrose & Romano, 1972
 Pocononia Petrunkevitch, 1953
 Pocononia whitei (Ewing, 1930) – Early Carboniferous, United States
 Somaspidion Jux, 1982
 Somaspidion hammapheron Jux, 1982
 Stenotrogulus Frič, 1904
 synonyms
= Cyclotrogulus Frič, 1904
= Pseudoeophrynus Příbyl, 1958
Stenotrogulus salmii (Stur, 1877) – Late Carboniferous, Czech Republic
synonyms
= Cyclotrogulus sturii Frič, 1904 [non Hasse, 1890]
= Pseudoeophrynus ostraviensis Příbyl, 1958

Family uncertain
 Aenigmatarbus Poschmann, Dunlop, Bértoux & Galtier, 2016
Aenigmatarbus rastelli Poschmann, Dunlop, Bértoux & Galtier, 2016 - Carboniferous, Graissessac, France
Namurotarbus Poschmann & Dunlop, 2010
Namurotarbus roessleri (Dunlop & Brauckmann, 2006) - Carboniferous, Hagen-Vorhalle
synonyms
= Archaeomartus roessleri Dunlop & Brauckmann, 2006
Permotarbus Dunlop & Rößler, 2013
Permotarbus schuberti Dunlop & Rößler, 2013 Permian, Chemnitz
Tynecotarbus Hradská & Dunlop, 2013
Tynecotarbus tichaveki Hradská & Dunlop, 2013 - Carboniferous, Týnec

incertae sedis
 Anthracophrynus Andrée, 1913
 Anthracophrynus tuberculatus Andrée, 1913 – Late Carboniferous, Germany
 Areomartus Petrunkevitch, 1913
Areomartus ovatus Petrunkevitch, 1913 - Carboniferous, West Virginia
‘Eophrynus’ scharfi Scharf, 1924 – Early Permian, Germany
Aphantomartus Pocock, 1911
Aphantomartus woodruffi (Scudder, 1893) - Carboniferous, Rhode Island

nomina dubia
 Anthracomartus buchi (Goldenberg, 1873) – Late Carboniferous, Germany
 Anthracomartus hageni (Goldenberg, 1873) – Late Carboniferous, Germany
 Elaverimartus pococki Petrunkevitch, 1953 – Late Carboniferous, Scotland
 Eurymartus latus Matthew, 1895 – Late Carboniferous, Canada
 ?Eurymartus spinulosus Matthew, 1895 – Late Carboniferous, Canada

References

 
Arachnid orders
Prehistoric arthropod orders
Silurian arachnids
Devonian arachnids
Carboniferous arachnids
Permian arachnids
Devonian arthropods of North America
Carboniferous arthropods of North America
Permian arthropods of North America
Carboniferous arthropods of Europe
Devonian arthropods of Europe
Permian arthropods of Europe
Silurian arthropods of Europe
Silurian first appearances
Cisuralian extinctions
Taxa named by Alexander Petrunkevitch